Hydrangea anomala, the Japanese climbing-hydrangea, is a species of flowering plant in the family Hydrangeaceae native to the woodlands of the Himalaya, southern and central China and northern Myanmar.

It is a woody climbing plant, growing to 12 m height up trees or rock faces, climbing by means of small aerial roots on the stems. The leaves are deciduous, ovate, 7–13 cm long and 4–10 cm broad, with a heart-shaped base, coarsely serrated margin and acute apex. The flowers are produced in flat corymbs 5–15 cm diameter in mid-summer; each corymb includes a small number of peripheral sterile white flowers 2–3.5 cm across, and numerous small, creamy-white fertile flowers 1–2 mm diameter. The fruit is a dry urn-shaped capsule 3–5 mm diameter containing several small winged seeds.

The closely related Hydrangea petiolaris from eastern Siberia, Japan, and Korea, is sometimes treated as a subspecies of H. anomala; it differs in growing larger (to 20 m) and flower corymbs up to 25 cm diameter. The common name Climbing hydrangea is applied to both species.

Cultivation and uses

Hydrangea anomala is grown as an ornamental plant. The subspecies H. anomala subsp. petiolaris has received the Royal Horticultural Society's Award of Garden Merit.

Etymology
‘Hydrangea’ is derived from Greek and means ‘water vessel’, which is in reference to the shape of its seed capsules.

‘Anomala’ means ‘anomalous’ or ‘unlike its fellows’.

References

External links
Flora of China: Hydrangea anomala

anomala
Flora of Japan
Flora of China
Garden plants